Steyerbromelia discolor is a plant species in the genus Steyerbromelia. This species is endemic to Venezuela.

References

Further reading
 

discolor
Flora of Venezuela